International direct dialing (IDD) or international subscriber dialling (ISD) is placing an international telephone call, dialed directly by a telephone subscriber, rather than by a telephone operator. Subscriber dialing of international calls typically requires an international call prefix (international dial-out code, international direct dial code, IDD code) to be dialed before the country code.

The term international subscriber dialling was used in the United Kingdom and Australia until the terminology was changed to international direct dialling. Since the late 20th century, most international calls are dialed directly.

For example, a landline subscriber in the UK wishing to call Australia would first dial 00 (the call prefix used in the UK to access the international service), then 61 (the calling code for Australia), then the Australian number (omitting the leading zero).

When telephone phone numbers are published for international use, the international access code is omitted, and the number is listed to start with a plus sign followed by the country calling code. The plus sign indicates that the country code follows, and that an access code may have to be dialed in the originating country.

The first transatlantic direct dial telephone call was made by Sally Reed in Dedham, Massachusetts to her penpal, Ann Morsley, in Dedham, Essex, in 1957.  It was witnessed by Reed's teacher, Grace Hine, Dedham's former chief telephone operator, Margaret Dooley, and several representatives of New England Telephone and Telegraph Company. In March 1970, the United States introduced a new nationwide system, called International Direct Distance Dialing (IDDD), as an extension of Direct Distance Dialing (DDD) that was inaugurated in 1951 in Englewood, New Jersey.

International call prefix
An "international call prefix", "international dial-out code" or "international direct dial code" (IDD code) is a trunk prefix that indicates an international phone call. In the dialling sequence, the prefix precedes the country calling code (and, further, the carrier code, if any, and the destination telephone number).

The international call prefix is defined in the telephone numbering plan of every country or telephone administration.
The International Telecommunication Union (ITU) recommendation E.164 specifies the sequence 00 as a standard for the international call prefix and this has been implemented by the majority of countries. Member countries of the North American Numbering Plan (NANP) use 011. Certain post-Soviet states continue to use 810 which was the universal IDD code across the Soviet Union. Other prefixes (000, 001, 0011, 119, etc.) are also in use in a small number of countries.

Some countries require that the prefix 00 is followed immediately by the so-called carrier selection code, i.e., a numeric code that routes the call via a specific provider for international connectivity. Some countries may require that any carrier selection codes precede the international call prefix.

Some countries also offer simplified dialling arrangements for calls to neighbouring countries, usually by removing the need of dialling an international call prefix and the country code.

To avoid confusion especially in international context, a plus sign (+) is often used as a graphic symbol of the international access code; it informs the caller to replace it with the prefix code appropriate for their country. Additionally, the GSM mobile telephony standard allows the use of the plus sign in place of the international call prefix; the mobile operator automatically converts the plus sign to the correct international access prefix for the country where the phone is actually being used. This permits the use of the same electronically stored directory number when calling from any country.

Example
The fictitious number (02) 3456 7890 in Sydney, Australia, is published in the form +61 2 3456 7890 for international use. In countries participating in the North American Numbering Plan, such as the United States, Canada, and some Caribbean nations, this number is dialed as 011 61 2 3456 7890, with 011 being the international call prefix for the NANP and 61 being the country calling code of Australia. From most of the rest of the world, the international access code is 00, so that the call is dialed as 00 61 2 3456 7890, as recommended by the regulations of  the ITU. (For Australians who wish to dial international numbers, the international access code when calling from Australia is 0011.)

See also 
List of country calling codes
List of international call prefixes

References

International telecommunications
Teletraffic